The 1976–77 IHL season was the 32nd season of the International Hockey League (IHL), a North American minor professional league. Nine teams participated in the regular season, and the Saginaw Gears won the Turner Cup.

Inquiry into professional sports
IHL commissioner Bill Beagan testified at the July 1976 United States House of Representatives inquiry into professional sports, which investigated United States antitrust law, the effect of United States nationality law, finances of leagues and their franchises, and violence in sport. He stated that IHL players were not considered professionals despite receiving some compensation, and were classified as amateurs by the Amateur Hockey Association of the United States (AHAUS). He testified that the IHL was the largest financial contributor to AHAUS at the time, had an agreement with the National Hockey League (NHL) to develop on-ice officials and players, but the World Hockey Association (WHA) showed no interested in negotiating any agreement. Beagan felt that the NHL was no longer able to contribute much towards amateur programs in the United States or Canada due to competition from the WHA, which undermined the IHL. He stated the league faced challenges to maintain quality due to changes to immigration laws which deterred participation by players and referees who were Canadian.

Regular season

Turner Cup-Playoffs

References
General

Specific

External links
 Season 1976/77 on hockeydb.com

IHL
International Hockey League (1945–2001) seasons